The Knight's Cross of the Iron Cross (German: Ritterkreuz des Eisernen Kreuzes) and its variants was the highest military award in Nazi Germany. Recipients are grouped by grades of the Knight's Cross. During or shortly after World War II, 145 German sailors and officers of the U-boat service as part of the Kriegsmarine received the Knight's Cross of the Iron Cross. Among them, 29 officers received the Knight's Cross of the Iron Cross with Oak Leaves (Ritterkreuz des Eisernen Kreuzes mit Eichenlaub), five the Knight's Cross of the Iron Cross with Oak Leaves and Swords (Ritterkreuz des Eisernen Kreuzes mit Eichenlaub und Schwertern), and two won the Knight's Cross of the Iron Cross with Oak Leaves Swords and Diamonds (Ritterkreuz des Eisernen Kreuzes mit Eichenlaub, Schwertern und Brillanten). Of these, 144 presentations were formally made and one recipient received the award after 11 May 1945, when Großadmiral Karl Dönitz ordered a cease of all promotions and illegalized all subsequent awards. The final recipient is therefore considered to have received the medal without legal authority.

Background
The Knight's Cross of the Iron Cross and its higher grades were based on four separate enactments. The first enactment,  of 1 September 1939 instituted the Iron Cross, the Knight's Cross of the Iron Cross and the Grand Cross of the Iron Cross. Article 2 of the enactment mandated that the award of a higher class be preceded by the award of all preceding classes. As the war progressed, some of the recipients of the Knight's Cross distinguished themselves further and a higher grade, the Knight's Cross of the Iron Cross with Oak Leaves, was instituted. The Oak Leaves, as they were commonly referred to, were based on the enactment  of 3 June 1940. In 1941, two higher grades of the Knight's Cross were instituted. The enactment  of 28 September 1941 introduced the Knight's Cross of the Iron Cross with Oak Leaves and Swords and the Knight's Cross of the Iron Cross with Oak Leaves, Swords and Diamonds. At the end of 1944 the final grade, the Knight's Cross of the Iron Cross with Golden Oak Leaves, Swords, and Diamonds, based on the enactment  of 29 December 1944, became the final variant of the Knight's Cross authorized.

Recipients
The Oberkommando der Wehrmacht kept separate Knight's Cross lists, one for each of the three military branches, Heer (Army), Kriegsmarine (Navy), Luftwaffe (Air force) and for the Waffen-SS. Within each of these lists a unique sequential number was assigned to each recipient. The same numbering paradigm was applied to the higher grades of the Knight's Cross, one list per grade.

Knight's Cross with Oak Leaves, Swords and Diamonds
The Knight's Cross with Oak Leaves, Swords and Diamonds is based on the enactment Reichsgesetzblatt I S. 613 of 28 September 1941 to reward those servicemen who had already been awarded the Oak Leaves with Swords to the Knight's Cross of the Iron Cross. Ultimately, it would be awarded to twenty-seven German soldiers, sailors and airmen, ranging from young fighter pilots to field marshals. Two recipients were members of the U-boat arm.

Knight's Cross with Oak Leaves and Swords
The Knight's Cross with Oak Leaves and Swords is also based on the enactment Reichsgesetzblatt I S. 613 of 28 September 1941 to reward those servicemen who had already been awarded the Oak Leaves to the Knight's Cross of the Iron Cross.

Knight's Cross with Oak Leaves
The Knight's Cross with Oak Leaves was based on the enactment Reichsgesetzblatt I S. 849 of 3 June 1940. The last officially announced number for the Oak Leaves was 843. Higher numbers are unofficial and therefore denoted in brackets.

Knight's Cross of the Iron Cross
The Knight's Cross of the Iron Cross is based on the enactment Reichsgesetzblatt I S. 1573 of 1 September 1939 Verordnung über die Erneuerung des Eisernen Kreuzes (Regulation of the renewing of the Iron Cross).

Legally disputed Knight's Cross recipients
Großadmiral Karl Dönitz ordered a cease of all promotions and awards as of 11 May 1945. Nevertheless, a number of Knight's Crosses were awarded after this date and are considered "illegal" hand-outs. One sailor of the U-boat service is often listed as a recipient of the Knight's Cross but falls outside of the Dönitz-decree. Karl Jäckel received his Knight's Cross confirmation after 11 May 1945 and is therefore a de facto but not de jure recipient.

References

Footnotes
  Some sources indicating that von Forstner succumbed to his injuries aboard  on 22 October 1943 have been found incorrect.
  Author Clemens Range dates Hans Lehmann's Knight's Cross on 8 June 1945, thus after the effectiveness of the Dönitz-decree. Walther-Peer Fellgiebel, author of Die Träger des Ritterkreuzes des Eisernen Kreuzes 1939-1945, indicates that Lehmann received the Knight's Cross on 11 May 1945, before the Dönitz-decree prohibited the awarding of the Knight's Cross. The sequential number 317 within the Kriegsmarine, 144 within the U-boat service, associated to Lehmann's Knight's Cross is based on author Clemens Range's work Die Ritterkreuzträger der Kriegsmarine and Busch and Röll's book Der U-Boot-Krieg 1939-1945 - Die Ritterkreuzträger der U-Boot-Waffe von September 1939 bis Mai 1945. Historian Veit Scherzer, whose work Die Ritterkreuzträger Die Inhaber des Ritterkreuzes des Eisernen Kreuzes 1939 von Heer, Luftwaffe, Kriegsmarine, Waffen-SS, Volkssturm sowie mit Deutschland verbündeter Streitkräfte nach den Unterlagen des Bundesarchives is based on the primary data from the German Federal Archives, indicates that the 7 May 1945 is the correct date.

Citations

Bibliography

External links

Lists of Knight's Cross of the Iron Cross recipients
 Uboote